The Division of Braddon is an Australian electoral division in the state of Tasmania. The current MP is Gavin Pearce of the Liberal Party, who was elected at the 2019 federal election.

Geography
Since 1984, federal electoral division boundaries in Australia have been determined at redistributions by a redistribution committee appointed by the Australian Electoral Commission. Redistributions occur for the boundaries of divisions in a particular state, and they occur every seven years, or sooner if a state's representation entitlement changes or when divisions of a state are malapportioned.

History

The division was created at the Tasmanian redistribution on 30 August 1955, essentially as a reconfigured version of the Division of Darwin. It is named for Sir Edward Braddon, a Premier of Tasmania and one of Tasmania's five original federal members of parliament.

Following the election of the Whitlam government and the period following the Franklin Dam controversy, Braddon became a relatively safe seat for the Liberal Party. In more recent years, the division has usually been a marginal seat, changing hands between the Australian Labor Party and the Liberal Party. Its most prominent member was Ray Groom. Groom was later to represent Denison in the Tasmanian Parliament 1986–2001 and served as Tasmanian Premier 1992–96.

Members

Election results

References

External links
 Division Braddon – Australian Electoral Commission

Electoral divisions of Australia
Constituencies established in 1955
1955 establishments in Australia
North West Tasmania
Western Tasmania
Braddon